According to the Bible, Admah (Heb. אַדְמָה) was one of the five cities of the Vale of Siddim. It was destroyed along with Sodom and Gomorrah. The location of Admah is unknown, although Bryant G. Wood a proponent of the southern theory for the Cities of the Plain identified the site with Numeira, but later changed it to Khirbat al-Khanazir Jordan, although it was only a cemetery during the Bronze Age  and proponents of the northern theory for the Cities of the Plain identify the site with Tel Nimrin, Jordan.

The town is mentioned figuratively in the Bible, in Deuteronomy and Book of Hosea.
 
There has also been some conjecture that Admah is mentioned in the Ebla tablets as the Eblaite word "ad-ma" or "ad-mu-utki" = (Town of) Admah.

See also
 Sodom and Gomorrah - two of the five "cities of the plain"
 Zeboim - one of the five "cities of the plain"
 Zoar, former Bela - one of the five "cities of the plain"

References

Torah cities
Destroyed cities